Kevin L. Huntley (born April 8, 1982) is a former professional American and Canadian football defensive tackle. He was signed by the Oakland Raiders as an undrafted free agent in 2005. He played college football for the Kansas State Wildcats.

Huntley was also a member of the Atlanta Falcons, Washington Redskins, Pittsburgh Steelers, Toronto Argonauts and Calgary Stampeders.

Professional career

Oakland Raiders
Huntley was signed as an undrafted free agent by the Oakland Raiders in 2005. He was released by the Raiders on August 29, 2007.

Atlanta Falcons
On September 12, 2007, he signed with the Atlanta Falcons but was released October 9. On October 29, 2007, he was signed back to the Falcons practice squad.

Washington Redskins
He signed with the Washington Redskins during the 2008 offseason but was released before playing in any games.

Pittsburgh Steelers
On August 12, 2008, he was claimed off waivers by the Pittsburgh Steelers, but was released on August 16.

Toronto Argonauts
Huntley was signed by the Toronto Argonauts on April 27, 2009 and was cut at the end of training camp. He was re-signed on July 10, 2009.  He tallied 5 tackles and 1 sack in his debut on July 11, 2009. On June 22, 2013 Huntley was released by the Argos. Huntley played 4 seasons with the Argos, amassing 123 tackles and 26 sacks.

Calgary Stampeders
Huntley was signed by the Calgary Stampeders on June 25, 2013.

References

1982 births
Living people
Players of American football from Washington, D.C.
American football defensive ends
Canadian football defensive linemen
American players of Canadian football
Kansas State Wildcats football players
Oakland Raiders players
Atlanta Falcons players
Washington Redskins players
Pittsburgh Steelers players
Toronto Argonauts players
Calgary Stampeders players
Archbishop Carroll High School (Washington, D.C.) alumni